Living All Alone is the seventh album by American soul singer-songwriter Phyllis Hyman. It was released by Philadelphia International Records in 1986. The album contains the title track, which peaked at No. 12 on the Billboard R&B singles chart and has become one of Hyman's most well-known hits.

Track listing

Personnel
Phyllis Hyman - vocals, whistling 
 LeRoy Bell - guitar, drums, percussion
 Thom Bell - synthesizer, piano
 Carla Benson - backing vocals
 Evette Benton - backing vocals
 Daryl Burgee - percussion
 Terry Burrus - keyboards
 Michael Dino Campbell - guitar
 Randy Cantor - keyboards
 Myra Casales - percussion
 Brian Castor - trombone
 Joe Fusco - guitar
 Steve Green - bass
 Reggie Griffin - synthesizer, guitar, saxophone, bass, drum programming, drum machine
 Cuca Hyman - backing vocals
 Josie James - backing vocals
 Casey James - synthesizer, percussion
 Ron Jennings - guitar
 Juanita Johnson - backing vocals
 Ron Kerber - soprano saxophone
 James King - backing vocals
 Johnny King - backing vocals
 Nick Martinelli - percussion
 Cindy Mizelle - backing vocals
 Alvin Moody - bass
 Doug Nally - drums
 Sam Peake - saxophone
 Clifford Rudd - drums
 Jim Salamone - percussion, drums
 Greg Scott - tenor saxophone
 Deborah Siler-Young - backing vocals
 Herb Smith - guitar
 Joseph Smithers, Jr. - trumpet, flugelhorn
 Studio Brass - horns
 Dexter Wansel - keyboards
 Terri Wells - backing vocals
 Audrey Wheeler - backing vocals
 Kae Williams, Jr. - bass, mirage, keyboards, piano

Production
 Producer: Thom Bell, Terry Burrus, Kenny Gamble, Reggie Griffin, Leon Huff, Phyllis Hyman, Juanita Johnson, Nick Martinelli and Dexter Wansel.
 Arranger: Thom Bell, Terry Burrus, Randy Cantor, Reggie Griffin, Nick Martinelli, Jim Salamone and Dexter Wansel.
 Horn Arrangements: Larry Davis.
 Engineers: Pete Humphries, Arthur Stoppe and Mike Tarsia.
 Assistant engineers: Randy Abrams, Poke, MacMinn and Adam Silverman Scott.
 Mixing: Mike Tarsia.
 Executive producer: Thom Bell, Kenny Gamble and Leon Huff.
 Photography: Jean Pagliuso.
 Clothing/Wardrobe: Cassandra McShepard.
 Make-Up: Allan Forbes.

References

External links
 

1986 albums
Phyllis Hyman albums
Albums produced by Kenneth Gamble
Albums produced by Leon Huff
Albums produced by Thom Bell
Albums arranged by Thom Bell
Albums recorded at Sigma Sound Studios
Philadelphia International Records albums